Chartered in 1890, the Suwannee Canal Company (also seen as the Suwanee Canal Company) had attempted to drain the Okefenokee Swamp.  The company had hoped that they could sell the drained land for various agricultural plantations.  The company also built a cypress lumber sawmill and the Brunswick and Pensacola Railroad to haul the lumber.  The company went bankrupt in 1897.

Canals in Florida
1890 establishments in Florida